Vyacheslav Knyazev (born 22 May 1974) is a retired Tajikistani footballer who played for the Tajikistan national football team.

Career statistics

International

International Goals

Honours
Varzob Dushanbe
Tajik League (1): 2006
Tajik Cup (1): 1999

References

External links

1974 births
Living people
Tajikistani footballers
Tajikistani expatriate footballers
Tajikistan international footballers
Association football defenders
Tajikistani people of Russian descent
Expatriate footballers in Uzbekistan
Expatriate footballers in Kazakhstan
Tajikistani expatriate sportspeople in Uzbekistan
Tajikistani expatriate sportspeople in Kazakhstan
CSKA Pamir Dushanbe players
FK Neftchi Farg'ona players